Mahmara Assembly constituency is one of the 126 assembly constituencies of Assam Legislative Assembly. Mahmara forms part of the Jorhat Lok Sabha constituency.

Members of Legislative Assembly

 1967: R. Konwar, Indian National Congress
 1972: Khagen Gogoi, Indian National Congress
 1978: Budha Barua, Revolutionary Communist Party of India
 1983: Narad Kamar, Indian National Congress
 1985: Chandra Arandhara, Independent
 1991: Lakhi Prasad Borgohain, Indian National Congress
 1996: Hiranya Kumar Konwar, Asom Gana Parishad
 2001: Sarat Saikia, Indian National Congress
 2006: Sarat Saikia, Indian National Congress
 2011: Sarat Saikia, Indian National Congress
 2016: Jogen Mohan, Bharatiya Janata Party
 2021: Jogen Mohan, Bharatiya Janata Party

Election results

2016 result

External links

References

Assembly constituencies of Assam